Stanley Sprenger Leonard (born September 26, 1931) is a timpanist, composer and educator who has been active in the percussion world for over seventy years. While Principal Timpanist of the Pittsburgh Symphony Orchestra for 38 years (1956-1994), he performed internationally with the symphony in concerts, television productions, and recordings." The Christian Science Monitor claimed, "...his performance of the solo part establishes him as perhaps the finest timpanist in the country." As a solo artist, he premiered several major new works for solo timpani and orchestra with the Pittsburgh Symphony Orchestra. In a review of "CelebrationsAn Overture for Timpani and Orchestra," the Pittsburgh Post-Gazette said, "Leonard played it superbly, imparting a singing line to this most unvocal instrument." In 2010, he was inducted into the Percussive Arts Society Hall of Fame, where they summed up his musical contribution: "Leonard has left an indelible musical footprint for musicians, especially percussionists." He is currently resident timpanist, composer, was handbell director at Vanderbilt Presbyterian Church, Naples, Florida, and continues to compose and teach master classes.

He has composed more than one hundred twenty pieces for percussion instruments, including timpani, timpani and organ, snare drum, and percussion ensemble. His compositions for percussion, voice, choral, piano, violin, and handbells are listed in "An Annotated Bibliography of Percussion Works by Stanley Leonard." He also composed method books, including Pedal Technique for the Timpani. This book's unique method helps the timpanist develop a total concept of timpani performance by producing kinesthetic confidence, achieved  by educating foot and leg movements in conjunction with the stroke of the stick, while also focusing on the pitch being tuned.

At Carnegie-Mellon University (1958-1978), he taught percussion, timpani and percussion ensemble. As Adjunct Professor of Percussion at Duquesne University (1989-2001), he taught timpani and conducted the percussion ensemble. He has taught clinics and master classes at schools across the US, including Curtis Institute of Music, Interlochen Center for the Arts, Manhattan School of Music, New England Conservatory of Music, University of North Texas College of Music, and Eastman School of Music.

He wrote two articles published in Percussive Notes.

Career timeline

1943–1949
Studied snare drum and marimba with Vera Daylin of the Kansas City Philharmonic
1945-1950
Performed timpani with the Independence Little Symphony
1946-1949
Studied timpani with Ben Udell of the Kansas City Philharmonic
1948–1950
Performed as percussionist with the Kansas City Philharmonic, Hans Schwieger, Music Director
1950–1951
Studied timpani with Edward Metzinger of the Chicago Symphony and Northwestern University
1951-1954
Studied percussion and timpani with William Street of the Eastman School of Music. Graduated 1954, Bachelor of Music, Performers Certificate in Percussion
1953-1954
Performed as percussionist with the Rochester Philharmonic, Erich Leinsdorf, Music Director
1952–1954
Charter member of Eastman Wind Ensemble, percussionist then timpanist; made first two recordings of the Eastman Wind Ensemble, Frederick Fennell, Conductor
1955–1956
Timpanist with the 19th Army Band; performed on ABC network series Soldier Parade with Arlene Francis and twice on the Ed Sullivan Show
1956-1994
Principal Timpanist Pittsburgh Symphony Orchestra
Music Directors: 1956-1976 William Steinberg, 1976-1984 Andre Previn, 1985-1994 Lorin Maazel
Made national and international tours
Made over fifty recordings for Capitol, Columbia, Philips, Angel, Command, Everest, and Sony; one received a Grammy Award (Maazel) and one a Gramophone Award, UK,  (Previn)
Appeared in the television series on PBS: Previn and the Pittsburgh Symphony Orchestra
Made five solo appearances:
{| class="wikitable"
|-
! Date
! Composer
! Title of composition
! Conductor
|-
| 1958
| Milhaud
| "Concerto for Percussion and Small Orchestra"
| Steinberg
|-
| 1964
| Tharichen
| "Concerto for Timpani and Orchestra" (American premier) 
| Steinberg
|-
| 1973
| McCulloh
| "Symphony Concertante for Timpanist and Orchestra" (world premier)
| Johanos
|-
| 1981
| Panufnik
| "Concertino for Timpani, Percussion, and Strings" (American premier)
| Previn
|-
| 1984
| Premru
| "Celebrations" (world premier)
| Previn
|}

Discography
On the CDs Canticle, Collage, Acclamation, and Reunion, Leonard directs and performs his compositions for percussion. Retrospections features his music and music by Brett W. Dietz. All CDs are available through the Sibley Music Library. Also directly from Stanley Leonard at www.StanleyLeonard.com
 Canticle (1995) — Duquesne University Alumni Percussion Ensemble, Stanley Leonard
 Collage (2007) — Hamiruge Percussion Group Louisiana State University, Stanley Leonard
 Acclamation (2010) — Stanley Leonard, Timpani, James Cochran, Organ, Matthew Sonneborn, Trumpet
 Reunion (2012) — Tempus Fugit Percussion Ensemble, Hamiruge Percussion Group, Stanley Leonard
 Jubilate (2015) — Three Rivers Ringers Handbell Ensemble
 Retrospections (2020) — Hamiruge Percussion Group Louisiana State University, Stanley Leonard

Compositions for percussion music
You can find the compositions listed here on ASCAP or in the Sibley Music Library.

Etude and method books
 Contemporary Album for Snare Drum (1986) LudwigMasters Publications
 Forty Hymns and Carols for Timpani (2002) PerMus Publications
 Four Duets for Timpani (2014) Alfred Music
 Orchestral Repertoire for the Timpani. An Introduction (1997) LudwigMasters Publications
 Pedal Technique for the Timpani (1988) LudwigMasters Publications
 Seventeen Technical Studies for Timpani (2014) Alfred Music
 The Timpani: Music and Mechanics (2000) Stanley S. Leonard
 Twelve Solo Etudes for the Advanced Timpanist (2015) Alfred Music

Unaccompanied timpani solos
 "Canticle" (1972) LudwigMasters Publications
 "Collage for Solo Timpani" (2009) C. Alan Publications
 "Danza" (2014) Bachovich Music Publications
 "Doubles" (1995) LudwigMasters Publications
 "Echoes of Seven" (2012) Mostly MarImba Music Publications
 "Echoes of Eight" (2014) Alfred Music
 "Echoes of Nine" (2002) LudwigMasters Publications
 "Forms" (1986) LudwigMasters Publications
 "Madras" (1981) Bachovich Music Publications
 "March and Scherzo" (2010) Bachovich Music Publications
 "Solo Dialogue for Four Timpani and Three Tom Toms" (1991) LudwigMasters Publications
 "Solus, with Multiple Percussion" (2000) RowLoff Productions

Timpani solo with other instruments
 "Canto for Solo Timpani and Trombone" (2004) Stanley S. Leonard
 "Canto II for Solo Timpani and French Horn" (2007) Stanley S. Leonard
 "Concertino for Timpani and Keyboard Percussion Ensemble" (1996) LudwigMasters Publications
 "Duetto Concertino for Timpani and French Horn" (1995) LudwigMasters Publications
 "Fanfare and Allegro for Solo Timpani and Trumpet" (1974) Boosey and Hawkes
 "Recitative and Scherzo for Solo Timpani and Percussion Ensemble" (2007) C. Alan Publications
 "Rhythmix for Solo Timpani and Percussion Quartet" (2015) C. Alan Publications

Timpani duos
 "Duo for Two Timpanists" (1997) LudwigMasters Publications
 "Duologue" (2012) Bachovich Publications
 "Four Duets for Timpani" (2014) Alfred Music

Timpani and organ and other instruments
 "Alleluia" (2003) Stanley S. Leonard
 "Ballad and Dance with Flute" (2013) Stanley S. Leonard
 "Celebration Hymn" (2005) Stanley S. Leonard
 "Easter Fanfare with Trumpet" (2009) Stanley S. Leonard
 "Easter Prologue with Trumpet" (2012) Stanley S. Leonard
 "Fanfare and Celebrations" (2018) Stanley S. Leonard
 "Fantasia on Luther’s Hymn" (2003) C. Alan Publications
 "Fantasia on St. Denio" (2007) Stanley S. Leonard
 "He Is Risen with Trumpet" (2005) PerMus Publications
 "Hornpipe" G. F. Handel, arranged by S. Leonard (2010) Stanley S. Leonard
 "Hymn of Joy" (2010) Stanley S. Leonard
 "In Dulci Jubilo" (2009) Stanley S. Leonard
 "O Come Emmanuel" (2005) PerMus Publications
 "Praise Ye The Lord" (2010) Stanley S. Leonard
 "Prelude" (2014) Stanley S. Leonard
 "Prelude on an Ancient Hymn with Flugelhorn" (2015) Stanley S. Leonard
 "The Rejoicing" G. F. Handel, arranged by S. Leonard (2010) Stanley S. Leonard
 "Theme and Variations" (2011) Stanley S. Leonard
 "Voluntary with Trumpet" (2003) Stanley S. Leonard

Percussion solos unaccompanied
 "Choirs" (2001) Alfred Music
 "Cascades" (2012) Stanley S. Leonard
 "Sonnet" (1978) Stanley S. Leonard
 "Ubique" (1970) Stanley S. Leonard

Percussion with other instruments
 "Collage with Flute" (1972) Stanley S. Leonard
 "On That Day with Organ" (1972) Stanley S. Leonard
 "Shadows with Keyboard Percussion Ensemble" (2006) C. Alan Publications
 "Triptych with organ, One Brass Instrument and Reader" (1970) Stanley S. Leonard
 "Will O' The Wisp with Bass Clarinet/Clarinet" (2005) Stanley S. Leonard

Two percussionists
 "Continuum" (1968) Stanley S. Leonard
 "Duales" (2014) Stanley S. Leonard.
 "Pairs" (2001) Rowloff Productions

Keyboard percussion ensemble
 "Ballade" (2018) LudwigMasters Publications
 "Four Canons" (1958) LudwigMasters Publications
 "Fanfares and Celebration (2022) Stanley S. Leonard
 "Masquerade" (Waltz)" (1974) Stanley S. Leonard
 "Mirror Canon" (1976) Boosey and Hawkes. 
 "Mirrors" (2012) Mostly Marimba Publications
 "Prelude for Four Marimbas" (1972) LudwigMasters Publications
 "Processional" (1997) Stanley S. Leonard 
 "Quarimba" (1995) LudwigMasters Publications
 "Rise Up O Flame" (1970) Stanley S. Leonard
 "Scherzo" (1975) Stanley S. Leonard 
 "Serenade" (1997) LudwigMasters Publications 
 "Two Contemporary Scenes" (1968) Stanley S. Leonard

Percussion ensemble

Three players
 "Three Spaces" (1969) Stanley S. Leonard
 "Trilogy" (2019) Stanley S. Leonard
 "Trioso" (2003) C. Alan Publications

Four players
 "Bachiana for percussion" (1974) Boosey and Hawkes
 "Cycle for Percussion" (1969) Stanley S. Leonard
 "Dance Suite" (1969) Stanley S. Leonard
 "Housemusic for Percussion" (1968) Stanley S. Leonard.
 "Kiwi" (2022) with optional fifth player  Stanley S. Leonard
 "Telin-Ting" (1974) Stanley S. Leonard
 "Time and Space" (2019) Stanley S. Leonard

Five players
 "Beachwalk" (1997) LudwigMasters Publications
 "Circus" (1972) LudwigMasters Publications
 "Closing Piece" (1969) Stanley S. Leonard
 "Presenting Percussion" (2007) PerMus Publications
 "The Advancing Gong" (1971) Stanley S. Leonard
 "Three Rivers" (2012) Stanley S. Leonard
 "Tupinam" (2022)  Stanley S. Leonard
 "Winged Chariot" (2003) C. Alan Publications
 "Word Games II" (1973) Stanley S. Leonard

Six players
 "Danza Bamboo" (2016) C. Alan Publications
 "Four Images" (1978) LudwigMasters Publications
 "Marche" (2001) RowLoff productions
 "Promenade" (1997) LudwigMasters Publications
 "The Gathering" (2021) Stanley S. Leonard
 "Zanza" (2003) Stanley S. Leonard

Seven players
 "Interiors" (2017) Stanley S. Leonard											
 "Journeys" (2022) Stanley S. Leonard
 "Metalliques" (2022) Stanley S. Leonard
 "Sacred Stones" (2004) C. Alan Publications

Eight players
 "Antiphonies" (2000) RowLoff Productions
 "Encounters" (2019) Stanley S. Leonard
 "Ex Machina" (2000) RowLoff productions
 "Etowah" (2020) Stanley S. Leonard
 "Fanfare, Meditation, and Dance" (1982) Stanley S. Leonard
 "Main Street" (2017) LudwigMasters Publications 
 "Pickerington" (2022) Stanley S. Leonard
 "Six Bagatelles" (2011) C. Alan Publications

Nine players
 "Dream" (2020) Stanley S. Leonard
 "Kymbalon" (2006) C. Alan Publications
 "Symphony for Percussion" (2009) RowLoff Productions.

Ten players
 "Skies" (2000) RowLoff Productions
 "Traveling Music" (2013) LudwigMasters Publications
 "Voices" (2011) Stanley S. Leonard

Eleven Players
 "Palindrome" (2023) Stanley S. Leonard

Twelve players
 "Festival Fanfare" (2001) Stanley S. Leonard

Fourteen players
 "Hurricane" (2006) C. Alan Publications
 "Janissary Band" (2011) C. Alan Publications
 "Retrospections Fanfare" (2013)  Stanley S. Leonard

Percussion ensemble with other instruments or voice
 "Good Christian Men Rejoice" (2000) Handbells RowLoff Productions
 "Winter Fantasy" (2000) Handbells Rowloff Productions

Notes

External links
Official Web Page of Stanley Leonard
National Association of Music Merchants: Oral History Interviews, Stanley Leonard
Sibley Music Library: Published and unpublished works and recordings by Stanley Leonard
ASCAP: Music by Stanley S. Leonard
Stanley Leonard performs Saul Goodman’s "Ballad for the Dance" (1983)
Stanley Leonard performs the second movement of his composition "Canticle" at PASIC (1996)
Stanley Leonard performs his composition "Concertino for Solo Timpani and Keyboard Percussion" with Tempus Fugit PASIC (1996)
Stanley Leonard performs part one of his composition "Concertino for Solo Timpani and Keyboard Percussion" with Tempus Fugit PASIC (1996)
Stanley Leonard performs part two of his composition "Concertino for solo timpani and Keyboard Percussion" with Tempus Fugit PASIC (1996)
Stanley Leonard performs his composition "O Come Emmanuel" with organist James Cochran (2007)
Stanley Leonard performs his composition "Fantasia on St. Denio" with organist James Cochran (2007)

Classical percussionists

American percussionists
Timpanists